A ground stop is an air traffic control measure that slows or halts the flow of aircraft inbound to a given airport. In other words, a ground stop is the halting of departing aircraft destined for one particular airport or for a specific geographic area.

For example, if a ground stop is called for Newark Liberty International Airport, aircraft departing for Newark from other airports will not be given departure clearance until such time that the ground stop in Newark is lifted. This allows, in this example, for Newark to deal with the task at hand preparing for arriving aircraft once the ground stop is lifted.

Ground stops may occur during an operational event, a thunderstorm, due to the danger of wind shear, hail, or another weather-related hazard.

A ground stop does not affect flights en route, but it is often accompanied by orders to divert to other cities.

Flights that have not departed their airport of origin will be delayed or cancelled. Airlines are required to manage their aircraft at all airports to minimize the impact to passengers affected by the ground stop.

Notable examples

On September 11, 2001, the U.S. Federal Aviation Administration (FAA) issued a ground stop for the entire United States as a precaution against possible additional terrorist attacks by airplane. In addition to grounding international flights which had not yet departed, flights already in the air were either returned to their origin departure airport or diverted to Canadian airports, Operation Yellow Ribbon. The ground stop was lifted on September 13, when departures from airports within the US also resumed.

In January 2014, Nav Canada issued a ground stop for Toronto Pearson due to cold weather. The airport authority said the extreme cold was causing "equipment freezing and safety issues for employees."

On January 25, 2019, the FAA declared a ground stop at New York's LaGuardia Airport over a staffing shortage caused by the government shutdown.

On January 10, 2022, the FAA issued a ground stop for the West Coast of the US and Hawaii. It is speculated it was related to a North Korean missile test, but no official reason was given by the FAA.

On July 25, 2022, a ground stop was declared at Dallas Love Field after a woman fired a gun into the air near the ticket counters, prompting an evacuation of the terminal.

On January 11, 2023, a nationwide ground stop was declared across the US following the failure of the FAA's NOTAM system.

On February 4, 2023, an immediate ground stop was issued by the FAA on the east coast of the Carolinas, impacting Myrtle Beach International Airport, Charleston International Airport and Wilmington International Airport, due to the 2023 Chinese balloon incident.

See also 

 Security Control of Air Traffic and Air Navigation Aids (SCATANA)
 Operation Yellow Ribbon

References 

Air traffic control